Dagfinn Aarskog (10 December 1928 – 27 May 2014) was a Norwegian physician.

Life
He was born in Ålesund, Norway. He received his MD at the University of Bergen in 1956, and received a PhD in medicine in 1965. Aarskog was a specialist in pediatrics (paediatrics) from 1964 and in medical genetics from 1974. In the period 1964 to 1965, he worked as a research assistant at Johns Hopkins Hospital. 

He was appointed professor of pediatrics at the University of Bergen. In 1970, he first described the condition that has later been called the Aarskog–Scott syndrome.

Aarskog held several international positions of trust, and was in 1992 appointed a Knight of the Order of St. Olav.

References

1928 births
2014 deaths
People from Ålesund
Norwegian pediatricians
Academic staff of the University of Bergen